"Higher than the Sun" is a song by English alternative rock band Keane, released on 28 September 2013 as the first single from their first compilation album, The Best of Keane. The song was recorded during the recording sessions for the band's fourth studio album, Strangeland, which was released in May 2012.

Release
Keane announced the release of the single on their official website on 23 September 2013. On 27 September, the song made its radio debut on Chris Evans' BBC Radio 2 morning show, and was released digitally the next day.

Critical reception
According to Contactmusic.com, "Higher Than the Sun" is "a punchy up-beat song with characteristic vocals from Tom Chaplin and an unforgettable chorus."

Music video
The music video for the song premiered on 2 October 2013 on Keane's YouTube channel. It was directed by Chris Boyle. The video is an animation mapping 10 years of Keane history, from an indie band to "one of the world's biggest British bands of the decade." It contains images resembling cover arts of the band's four albums, and shows abstract caricatures and sketches, and the band performing on stage.

Charts

References

Keane (band) songs
2013 singles
Songs written by Tim Rice-Oxley
Songs written by Tom Chaplin
Songs written by Richard Hughes (musician)
Songs written by Jesse Quin
2013 songs